Phupha, or Downriver Phula, is a dialect cluster of Loloish languages spoken by the Phula people of China. There are four principal varieties, which may be considered distinct languages:
Phupha, Alugu (Alugu Phupha)
Phupa, Phuza.
Usage is decreasing apart from Alugu, which is taught in primary schools.

References

Works cited

 

Loloish languages
Languages of China